Farideh Ghotbi (née Tadji Ghotbi; 1 February 1920 – 29 November 2000), also known as Farideh Diba, was an Iranian public figure. She was the mother of Farah Pahlavi (née Diba), the former Shahbanu and third wife of Mohammad Reza Pahlavi, the last Shah of Iran. Ghotbi was known for her influence on both her daughter and within the Diba and Pahlavi families.

Biography 
Tadji Ghotbi was born on 1 February 1920 in Lahijan in the Gilan province, Qajar Iran. She was related to the Sufi master,  (c. 1601–1664). Ghotbi attended Jeanne d'Arc School in Tehran. 

In 1937, she married , a Captain in the Imperial Iranian Army and law student. They had a daughter, Farah Diba born on October 14, 1938. In the summers the family would live in Shemiran, to escape the heat. In 1946, her husband Sohrab Diba fell ill and died a year later of pancreatic cancer. 

With the marriage of her daughter Farah to Mohammad Reza Pahlavi on 20 December 1959, she became a member of the Iranian imperial family. She was very close with her younger granddaughter Leila Pahlavi and helped raise her. After the start of the Iranian Revolution in 1978, Ghotbi lived in exile in Paris.

Death and legacy 
She died on 29 November 2000 in Paris and was buried in the Passy Cemetery. Her granddaughter Leila died six months later on 10 June 2001 in London; they were buried next to each other in the same cemetery. 

The posthumously published book, Dokhtaram Farah (English: My Daughter Farah) (2001, Behfarin Publications) was falsely attributed as a memoir written by Farideh Ghotbi. 

The Sa'dabad Complex (Persian: مجموعه سعدآباد; Majmue ye Sa’dābād) in Shemiran, Greater Tehran houses the Museum of Artistic Creatures, which was once known as the Palace of Farideh Ghotbi. 

The Iranian television historical drama The Enigma of the Shah (2014–2016), featured actress Afsaneh Naseri as Farideh.

References

External links 

 
 Video: 1970s Interview with Farideh Ghotbi Mother of Iran Empress Farah Diba, from Kinolibrary

1920 births
2000 deaths
People from Lahijan
Exiles of the Iranian Revolution in France
20th-century Iranian women
People of Pahlavi Iran
Burials at Passy Cemetery